Cho Lae is a tambon (subdistrict) of Mae Taeng District, in Chiang Mai Province, Thailand. In 2020 it had a total population of 4,330 people.

Administration

Central administration
The tambon is subdivided into 6 administrative villages (muban).

Local administration
The whole area of the subdistrict is covered by the town (Thesaban Mueang) Mueang Kaen Phatthana (เทศบาลเมืองเมืองแกนพัฒนา).

References

External links
Thaitambon.com on Cho Lae

Tambon of Chiang Mai province
Populated places in Chiang Mai province